A deep map is a map with greater information than a two-dimensional image of places, names, and topography.

One such kind of intensive exploration of place was popularised by author William Least Heat-Moon with his book PrairyErth: A Deep Map.  A deep map work can take the form of engaged documentary writing of literary quality. It may be performed in long-form on radio. It does not preclude the combination of writing with photography and illustration. Its subject is a particular place, usually quite small and limited, and usually rural.

Some call the approach "vertical travel writing", while archeologist Michael Shanks compares it to the eclectic approaches of 18th- and early-19th-century antiquarian topographers or to the psychogeographic excursions of the early Situationist International.

Such a deep map goes beyond simple landscape/history-based topographical writing to include and interweave autobiography, archeology, stories, memories, folklore, traces, reportage, weather, interviews, natural history, science, and intuition. In its best form, the resulting work arrives at a subtle, multi-layered and "deep" map of a small area of the earth.

US scholars and writers of bioregionalism have promoted the concept of deep maps. The best known US examples are Wallace Stegner's Wolf Willow (1962) and Heat-Moon's PrairyErth (1991).

In Great Britain, the method is used by those who use the terms spirit of place and local distinctiveness. BBC Radio 4 has recently undertaken several series of radio documentaries that are deep maps. These are inspired by the "sense of place" work of the Common Ground organisation.

As used in the field of geographical information systems, deep maps have more kinds of information than 2D images with labels. They may have 3D information, census information, health or immigrant or education information; information on particular buildings, museum artifacts and where they are from, and the overall demographics of cities. They can link places to documents about their history.  They can help support subjective descriptions, and narratives and as a storytelling approach they can help make complex and large-scale technical information legible and meaningful for local communities.

See also
Cultural region
Spirit of place
Spiral Jetty
Geographic Information Systems

References

Cultural geography
Psychogeography
Map types